Thomas William Basden (born 30 November 1980) is an English actor, comedy writer, and a member of the British four-man sketch group Cowards. He has written and performed extensively for comedy shows on the BBC and Channel 4 and often collaborates in two-man shows with fellow Cowards member Tim Key.

Education
Tom Basden was born in Sutton, Greater London. He was educated at King's College School, a private school for boys in Wimbledon in South-West London, where he was in the same year as fellow actors Khalid Abdalla and Ben Barnes; followed by Pembroke College, Cambridge. He was vice-president of Cambridge Footlights and his contemporaries included Stefan Golaszewski, Sarah Solemani, Tim Key (who pretended to be studying for a Ph.D at Cambridge to be part of a Footlights production) and Dan Stevens.

Career

Performance 
Basden's one-man show at the 2007 Edinburgh Festival Fringe, Tom Basden Won't Say Anything, won the "if.comedy award" for Best Newcomer. He starred with Tim Key in the 2007 short film The One and Only Herb McGwyer Plays Wallis Island, which won the UK Film Council Kodak Award for Best British Short Film.

In 2008 Basden appeared as the resident musician for the second series of the BBC Radio 4 comedy show Mark Watson Makes the World Substantially Better, replacing Tim Minchin.

He was a guest panellist on the BBC Two comedy show Never Mind the Buzzcocks in November 2009.

In 2012 he appeared as Key's musical sidekick in the Radio 4 programme Tim Key's Late-Night Poetry.

Since 2013, Basden has co-written and appeared in the ITV ancient-Rome sitcom Plebs. He played a lead role the 2013 BBC Two comedy thriller The Wrong Mans. He co-wrote the third and fifth episodes of series one, and wrote both episodes of series two which aired the following year.

He played Dan the sound engineer in the 2016 film David Brent: Life on the Road, and Jeremy Corbyn in the 2018 Royal Wedding special of The Windsors. He had a main role as Matt in the Netflix comedy series After Life. He wrote and appeared in the 2022 BBC sitcom Here We Go. He starred as Mr Short in the 2022 Netflix young adult sci-fi series The Last Bus.

Writing 

Basden's 2010 play Party, about a group of university students holding a meeting to found their own political party, was performed at the Arts Theatre in London. Brian Logan, writing for The Guardian, gave it a four out of a possible five stars and describing it "an idiosyncratic and highly enjoyable piece performed beautifully by a crack cast of upcoming comics", while Dominic Cavendish for The Daily Telegraph called it "astute (and) stingingly amusing". A radio adaptation of the play produced by Julia McKenzie was broadcast on Radio 4 for three series and a Christmas special from 2010 to 2018. In addition to writing the adaptation, Basden appeared, alongside Tim Key, Jonny Sweet, Anna Crilly and Katy Wix.

His play Joseph K, based on Franz Kafka's novel The Trial and starring Tim Key, was longlisted for the 2011 Evening Standard Theatre Awards Most Promising Playwright: it also received positive reviews from The Guardian and The Daily Telegraph.

In 2011 he wrote There Is a War, starring himself and Phoebe Fox, for the National Theatre's Double Feature.

Basden co-wrote the Channel 4 sitcom Fresh Meat, which earned him a nomination for the 2012 BAFTA Craft Awards Break-Through Talent Award.

Awards

References

External links
Official Cowards website
 

1980 births
Alumni of Pembroke College, Cambridge
People educated at King's College School, London
Living people
English comedy writers
English male comedians
English male television actors
English male stage actors
20th-century English comedians
21st-century English comedians
People from the London Borough of Sutton